Claude Mulot (1942–1986) was a French screenwriter and film director who mainly specialized in adult films, but also made various attempts in other genres like horror films (The Blood Rose), comedies (Le jour se lève et les conneries commencent) and thrillers (Le Couteau sous la gorge). He accidentally drowned at the early age of 44 while his screenplay On se calme et on boit frais à Saint-Tropez was being shot by Max Pécas in Saint-Tropez in 1986.

Filmography

as a director 
 1968 : Sexyrella starring  Véronique Beauchêne and Velly Beguard
 1970 : The Blood Rose (La Rose écorchée) starring  Anny Duperey, Philippe Lemaire, Howard Vernon and Elizabeth Teissier
 1970 : La Saignée starring  Bruno Pradal, Charles Southwood and Patti D'Arbanville
 1973 : Profession : Aventuriers starring  Nathalie Delon and André Pousse
 1974 : Les Charnelles (aka Émotions secrètes d'un jeune homme de bonne famille) starring Anne Libert and Francis Lemonnier
 1974 : C'est jeune et ça sait tout (aka Y'a pas de mal à se faire du bien / L'éducatrice) starring  Jean Lefebvre, Michel Galabru and Andrée Cousineau
 1975 : Le sexe qui parle starring  Pénélope Lamour and Sylvia Bourdon
 1976 : Shocking! starring Emmanuelle Parèze and Karine Gambier
 1976 : Échanges de partenaires starring Karine Gambier
 1976 : La Rage de jouir starring  Marie-Christine Guennec
 1977 : Suprêmes jouissances
 1977 : La Grande Baise
 1977 : Insomnies sous les tropiques starring  Barbara Moose
 1978 : Le Sexe qui parle 2 starring  Erika Cool
 1980 : La Femme objet starring  Marilyn Jess
 1980 : L'Immorale starring  Sylvia Lamo and Isabelle Illiers
 1980 : Les Petites Écolières starring  Brigitte Lahaie, Marilyn Jess and Cathy Stewart
 1981 : Le jour se lève et les conneries commencent starring  Henri Guybet and Maurice Risch
 1983 : Black Venus starring  Joséphine Jacqueline Jones and Karin Schubert
 1986 : Le Couteau sous la gorge starring Florence Guérin and Brigitte Lahaie

External links
 

1942 births
1986 deaths
Burials at Passy Cemetery
French film directors
French male screenwriters
20th-century French screenwriters
Writers from Paris
French pornographic film directors
20th-century French male writers